Colorado's 30th Senate district is one of 35 districts in the Colorado Senate. It has been represented by Republican Kevin Van Winkle since June 2022, following the resignation of fellow Republican Chris Holbert.

Geography
District 30 covers the far southern suburbs of Denver in Douglas County, including Highlands Ranch, Lone Tree, Meridian, Stonegate, Acres Green, Roxborough Park, and small parts of Parker and Littleton.

The district overlaps with Colorado's 4th and 6th congressional districts, and with the 39th, 43rd, 44th, and 45th districts of the Colorado House of Representatives.

Recent election results
Colorado state senators are elected to staggered four-year terms; under normal circumstances, the 30th district holds elections in midterm years. The 2022 election will be the first held under the state's new district lines.

2022
In May 2022, incumbent Senator Chris Holbert resigned, saying that he intended to move to Florida. State Rep. Kevin Van Winkle was chosen to take Holbert's place, and is seeking a full term in 2022.

Historical election results

2018

2014

Federal and statewide results in District 30

References 

30
Douglas County, Colorado